Scott Aaron Garnett (born December 3, 1962) is a former American football defensive lineman who played four seasons in the National Football League for the Denver Broncos, San Francisco 49ers, San Diego Chargers, and Buffalo Bills.  He played college football at the University of Washington and was drafted in the eighth round of the 1984 NFL Draft.

College
Garnett was a four-year letterman for Washington from 1980 to 1983.

References

1962 births
Living people
American football defensive linemen
Washington Huskies football players
Denver Broncos players
San Francisco 49ers players
San Diego Chargers players
Buffalo Bills players
African-American players of American football
Players of American football from Harrisburg, Pennsylvania
21st-century African-American people
20th-century African-American sportspeople